Katharine Venable Cashman  is an American volcanologist, professor of volcanology at the University of Bristol and former Philip H. Knight Professor of Natural Science at the University of Oregon.

Education
Cashman was educated at Middlebury College, Vermont where she was awarded a Bachelor of Arts degree in Geology and Biology in 1976. She continued her studies at Victoria University of Wellington in New Zealand and then completed her PhD at Johns Hopkins University, Maryland, in 1986. Her PhD research applied theories of crystal size distributions to volcanic systems, and was supervised by Bruce Marsh.

Career and research
She was an assistant professor at Princeton University from 1986 to 1991, and then an associate professor (1991–1997) and full professor (1997–present) at the University of Oregon. She moved to the University of Bristol in 2011 on a research professorship funded by the AXA insurance.

Cashman studies links between chemical and physical factors that control magma ascent, eruption, and emplacement on the Earth's surface. She has studied volcanoes on all seven continents and explored a wide range of eruption styles. She is best known for her work that links the kinetics of bubble and crystal formation to the behaviour of volcanic materials, but has worked on problems that span from the chemical to physical to social aspects of volcanism. She has worked with all the US volcano observatories and served on the scientific advisory committee for the island of Montserrat.

Her research uses a combination of volcanology, igneous petrology, kinetics, microscopy and fluid dynamics with a focus on mafic volcanoes. This includes channel development in Hawaiian lava flows and volcanic ash formation in eruptions. She also has interests in intermediate composition and silicic volcanoes, particularly at Mount St. Helens.

Awards and honours
Cashman was elected to the National Academy of Sciences in 2016. She was also elected a Fellow of the Royal Society (FRS) in 2016.  she holds a Royal Society Wolfson Research Merit Award. She is a Fellow of the American Geophysical Union and the American Academy of Arts and Sciences, and is a member of the Academia Europaea. She is a member of the International Association of Volcanology and Chemistry of the Earth's Interior (IACVEI).

In 2020 she was awarded the Murchison Medal by the Geological Society of London.

References

1954 births
Living people
American volcanologists
Fellows of the Royal Society
Female Fellows of the Royal Society
Members of Academia Europaea
Fellows of the American Academy of Arts and Sciences
Fellows of the American Geophysical Union
Members of the United States National Academy of Sciences
Victoria University of Wellington alumni
Johns Hopkins University alumni
University of Oregon faculty
Academics of the University of Bristol